Moll Anderson (née Molly R. Ruffalo) is an inspirational interior designer, life stylist, author, and  former singer and national iHeart Radio host on The Moll Anderson Show. She is the  author of Change Your Home, Change Your Life with Color, "'Seductive Tables For Two," "The Seductive Home Limited Edition," "The Seductive Home," and author of "Change Your Home, Change Your Life." She has been a regular contributor on The Doctors and a guest co-host on FabLife  and she has been a featured guest on CBS’ The Talk, Access Hollywood Live, Good Day LA, ABC's Good Morning America, NBC's The Today Show, the nationally syndicated Dr. Phil Show, and The Doctors. Anderson has written a monthly column for Nashville Lifestyles  and currently writes a  column for SuCasa Magazine.  She has been featured in InStyle Magazine, Cosmopolitan Magazine, and other national publications. Anderson also served as both host and designer for shows such as E! Style Network's Look for Less: Home Edition, HGTV’s Hot Trends in Outdoor Entertaining, and Turner South’s Southern Home by Design. Anderson was a featured blogger on Magazines.com.

Books 
•Change Your Home, Change Your Life with Color, What’s Your Color Story? (March 2017) a 256 page, hardcover featuring thirteen colors in individual chapters, each includes simple color solutions, “Pop of Color” additions, and color lessons and stories from Moll's designs and life. Hundreds of beautiful vibrant photographs highlight a fresh modern approach to transforming with color. 
Seductive Tables for Two, Tablescapes, Picnics,& Recipes That Inspire Romance (2012): a 240-page, flexi-bound book featuring inspirational photos, tablescapes, entertaining tips, helpful sidebars, and recipes encouraging intimate dining for two. 
 The Seductive Home: Limited/Gold Box Editions (2011): more than 300 pages of Moll Anderson's three personal homes. This interior design coffee table book is finished with gold-gilded pages and contains photographs, recipes, and inspiration throughout. This book was launched at Donna Karan New York. Anderson completed a national book signing tour with Neiman Marcus.
Change your Home, Change Your Life (2006): a 224-page paperback home design book featuring photos, how-to projects, tips, wisdom and advice encouraging you to discover a new way of living.

Singer: Giorgio Moroder Project 
She was a singer of Giorgio Moroder Project and performed To Be Number One at 1990 FIFA World Cup opening ceremony

Awards 
UNICEF Spirit of Compassion Award, (2016) Moll Anderson received the Spirit of Compassion Award at the UNICEF Snowflake Ball  
Gracie Award Winner, Outstanding On-Air Talent: Lifestyle/Health Program as a contributor on The Doctors-Stage 29 Productions (2015)

Gracie Award Winner, Outstanding Host Lifestyle Program for The Moll Anderson Show (2013), (2014)

Donna Karen's Women Who Inspire (2011)

Emmy for entertainment reporting (1993)

References 

Living people
American interior designers
American women interior designers
1959 births
21st-century American women